Leonid Yuryevich Kaznakov (born 12 December 1963) is a former figure skater who represented the Soviet Union. He won medals at the Nebelhorn Trophy, Grand Prix International St. Gervais, and Soviet Championships. After retiring from competition, he performed in ice shows.

Competitive highlights

References 

1963 births
Soviet male single skaters
Living people
Figure skaters from Saint Petersburg